The 2019 Super League of Malawi (known as the TNM Super League for sponsorship reasons) was the 34th season of the Super League of Malawi, the top professional league for association football clubs in Malawi since its establishment in 1986. It started on 13 April 2019 and ended on 22 December 2019.
Nyasa Big Bullets were the defending champions of the previous season. Nyasa Big Bullets have been crowned the Super League champions for the second consecutive season following a 2–0 victory over TN Stars in the last round.

Teams 
Sixteen teams competed in the league – the top thirteen teams from the previous season and the three promoted teams as winners of the regional leagues: Ntopwa (Southern Region Football League), Mlatho Mponela (Central Region Football League) and Chitipa United (Northern Region Football League).

League table

Top scorers

References

External links
Official Website

2019
Premier League
Malawi